Charlottenburg-Wilmersdorf is the fourth borough of Berlin, formed in an administrative reform with effect from 1 January 2001, by merging the former boroughs of Charlottenburg and Wilmersdorf.

Overview
Charlottenburg-Wilmersdorf covers the western city centre of Berlin and the adjacent affluent suburbs. It borders on the Mitte borough in the east, on Tempelhof-Schöneberg in the southeast, Steglitz-Zehlendorf in the south, Spandau in the west and on Reinickendorf in the north. The district includes the inner city localities of Charlottenburg, Wilmersdorf and Halensee.

After World War II and the city's division by the Berlin Wall, the area around Kurfürstendamm and Bahnhof Zoo was the centre of former West Berlin, with the Kaiser Wilhelm Memorial Church as its landmark. The Technical University of Berlin (Technische Universität Berlin), the Berlin University of the Arts (Universität der Künste), the Federal Institute for Risk Assessment (Bundesinstitut für Risikobewertung), the Deutsche Oper Berlin as well as Charlottenburg Palace and the Olympic Stadium are also located in Charlottenburg-Wilmersdorf.

Demographics
, the borough had a population of 326,354, of whom about 110,000 (34%) were of non-German origin. The largest ethnic minorities were Turks at 4%; Poles at 3.5%; Arabs, former Yugoslavians and Afro-Germans at 2.5% each; Russians at 1.5%; and Ukrainians and Iranians at 1.0% each.

Subdivision
Charlottenburg-Wilmersdorf is divided into seven localities:

The localities of Schmargendorf and Grunewald were part of the former Wilmersdorf borough until 2001. By resolution of 30 September 2004, the localities of Westend and Charlottenburg-Nord were created on the territory of the former Charlottenburg borough, like Halensee on the territory of the former Wilmersdorf borough.

Politics

District council
The governing body of Charlottenburg-Wilmersdorf is the district council (Bezirksverordnetenversammlung). It has responsibility for passing laws and electing the city government, including the mayor. The most recent district council election was held on 26 September 2021, and the results were as follows:

! colspan=2| Party
! Lead candidate
! Votes
! %
! +/-
! Seats
! +/-
|-
| bgcolor=| 
| align=left| Alliance 90/The Greens (Grüne)
| align=left| Kirstin Bauch
| 42,720
| 24.7
|  4.9
| 15
|  3
|-
| bgcolor=| 
| align=left| Social Democratic Party (SPD)
| align=left| Heike Schmitt-Schmelz
| 38,058
| 22.0
|  3.1
| 14
|  1
|-
| bgcolor=| 
| align=left| Christian Democratic Union (CDU)
| align=left| Judith Stückler
| 37,883
| 21.9
|  0.3
| 13
| ±0
|-
| bgcolor=| 
| align=left| Free Democratic Party (FDP)
| align=left| Stefanie Beckers
| 16,987
| 9.8
|  0.5
| 6
| ±0
|-
| bgcolor=| 
| align=left| The Left (LINKE)
| align=left| Annetta Juckel
| 13,038
| 7.5
|  0.3
| 4
| ±0
|-
| bgcolor=| 
| align=left| Alternative for Germany (AfD)
| align=left| Michael Seyfert
| 8,174
| 4.7
|  5.0
| 3
|  2
|-
| colspan=8 bgcolor=lightgrey|
|-
| bgcolor=| 
| align=left| Tierschutzpartei
| align=left| 
| 3,648
| 2.1
| New
| 0
| New
|-
| bgcolor=| 
| align=left| Volt Germany
| align=left| 
| 3,245
| 1.9
| New
| 0
| New
|-
| bgcolor=| 
| align=left| Die PARTEI
| align=left| 
| 2,681
| 1.5
|  0.0
| 0
| ±0
|-
| bgcolor=| 
| align=left| dieBasis
| align=left| 
| 2,531
| 1.5
| New
| 0
| New
|-
| bgcolor=| 
| align=left| Free Voters
| align=left| 
| 1,294
| 0.7
| New
| 0
| New
|-
| bgcolor=| 
| align=left| Klimaliste
| align=left| 
| 813
| 0.5
| New
| 0
| New
|-
| bgcolor=| 
| align=left| Pirate Party Germany
| align=left| 
| 589
| 0.4
|  1.2
| 0
| ±0
|-
| bgcolor=| 
| align=left| The Humanists
| align=left| 
| 479
| 0.3
| New
| 0
| New
|-
| 
| align=left| We are Berlin
| align=left| 
| 430
| 0.2
| New
| 0
| New
|-
| bgcolor=| 
| align=left| Ecological Democratic Party
| align=left| 
| 276
| 0.2
| New
| 0
| New
|-
| bgcolor=| 
| align=left| Liberal Conservative Reformers
| align=left| 
| 136
| 0.1
| New
| 0
| New
|-
! colspan=3| Valid votes
! 173,082
! 99.2
! 
! 
! 
|-
! colspan=3| Invalid votes
! 1,360
! 0.8
! 
! 
! 
|-
! colspan=3| Total
! 174,442
! 100.0
! 
! 55
! ±0
|-
! colspan=3| Electorate/voter turnout
! 246,148
! 70.9
!  7.9
! 
! 
|-
| colspan=8| Source: Elections Berlin
|}

District government
The district mayor (Bezirksbürgermeister) is elected by the Bezirksverordnetenversammlung, and positions in the district government (Bezirksamt) are apportioned based on party strength. Kirstin Bauch of the Greens was elected mayor on 16 December 2021. Since the 2021 municipal elections, the composition of the district government is as follows:

Twin towns – sister cities

Charlottenburg-Wilmersdorf is twinned with:

 Apeldoorn, Netherlands (1968)
 Bad Iburg, Germany (1980)
 Belváros-Lipótváros (Budapest), Hungary (1998)
 Forchheim (district), Germany (1991)
 Gagny, France (1992)
 Gladsaxe, Denmark (1968)
 Karmiel, Israel (1985)
 Kulmbach (district), Germany (1991)
 Lewisham, England, United Kingdom (1968)
 Linz, Austria (1995)
 Mannheim, Germany (1962)
 Marburg-Biedenkopf, Germany (1991)
 Międzyrzecz, Poland (1993)
 Minden, Germany (1968)
 Or Yehuda, Israel (1966)
 Pechersk (Kyiv), Ukraine (1991)
 Rheingau-Taunus (district), Germany (1991)
 Split, Croatia (1970)
 Sutton, England, United Kingdom (1968)
 Trento, Italy (1966)
 Waldeck-Frankenberg, Germany (1988)

Economy

The borough's economy largely depends on retail trade, mainly in the City West area along Kurfürstendamm, Breitscheidplatz and Tauentzienstraße, with supra-local importance.

The Berliner Börse (Berlin Stock Exchange) is housed in the Ludwig-Erhard-Haus designed by Nicholas Grimshaw at Fasanenstraße 85 in Berlin-Charlottenburg near Bahnhof Zoologischer Garten

The Royal Porcelain Factory in Berlin (German: Königliche Porzellan-Manufaktur Berlin) (KPM) is also situated in Charlottenburg, near Berlin-Tiergarten Station

The Messe Berlin (Exhibition Grounds/Trade Fair Center) is situated in Berlin-Westend

Air Berlin had its headquarters in Building 2 of the Airport Bureau Center in Charlottenburg-Nord.  Air Berlin employed 1,200 employees at its headquarters. Germania has its headquarters in Charlottenburg-Nord.

Education

There are 74 schools in the city. There are 29,446 students attending these schools, 5,261 are foreigners. Of the 12,993 students studies in 38 primary schools while the number of students studying in the ymansiums is 9,617. In addition, there are 3 Hauptschule, 6 Realschule and 14 Gymnasium in the Charlottenburg-Wilmersdorf.

The district also has two universities, Technical University of Berlin and Berlin University of the Arts. In 2011, the Technical University of Berlin was named the 46th best university in the world in engineering and technology according to the QS World University Rankings.

Higher education 
  Universität der Künste (Berlin University of the Arts)
 Technische Universität Berlin (Technical University of Berlin)
Bbw University of Applied Sciences
ESCP Business School
Touro College Berlin

Primary and secondary schools  
 Comenius-Schule, a primary school, is in Wilmersdorf.
 Halensee-Grundschule, a primary school, is in Halensee.
 Jüdische Traditionsschule, traditionell Jewish primary and secondary school in Westend
 Heinz-Galinski-Schule Charlottenburg, Jewish primary school
 Svenska Skolan Berlin, Swedish School Berlin
 Nelson-Mandela-School, International School
 Goethe-Gymnasium, one of the most popular secondary schools in Berlin
 Peter-Ustinov-Schule, located between Messe Nord and Wilmersdorfer Straße.
Evangelisches Gymnasium zum Grauen Kloster, School of the Evangelical Church

Weekend education
 The Japanische Ergänzungsschule in Berlin e.V. (ベルリン日本語補習授業校 Berurin Nihongo Hoshū Jugyō Kō), a weekend Japanese supplementary school, is held at Halensee-Grundschule.
 Zentrale Schule für Japanisch Berlin e.V. (共益法人ベルリン中央学園補習授業校 Kyōeki Hōjin Berurin Chūō Gakuen Hoshū Jugyō Kō), another weekend Japanese supplementary school, is held at the Comenius-Schule - Established April 1997.

See also

 Berlin-Charlottenburg-Wilmersdorf (electoral district)
 Berlin-Spandau – Charlottenburg North (electoral district)

References

External links

 Official homepage of Charlottenburg-Wilmersdorf
 Official homepage of Berlin

 
Districts of Berlin
Populated places established in 2001